Kopanja is a surname from Bosnia and Herzegovina. Notable people with the surname include:

Željko Kopanja (1954–2016), Bosnian Serb newspaper editor

See also
Kopanjane, village in the municipality of Vranje, Serbia 

Bosnian surnames
Serbian surnames